Bryan is a city in, and the county seat of, Williams County, Ohio, United States. The population was 8,729 at the 2020 census.

History

Bryan was platted in 1840 by John A. Bryan, and named for him. It was incorporated as a village in 1841, and reincorporated as a city in 1941.

Williams County was originally part of Defiance County, with Defiance as the county seat. The area was later split into Williams and Defiance counties.  Bryan was named the seat for the new county, but not without conflict; the village of Montpelier was considered a more centralized location. The people of Montpelier petitioned the state legislature, but in the end Bryan was named county seat because of its greater industrial and commercial importance and because of its higher population. To this day, many people still argue about the state's decision and a rivalry of sorts remains between the two communities.

A strip of Williams County north of Bryan was originally part of a conflict known as the Toledo War, between Ohio and Michigan. Both states claimed the land, the Toledo Strip, which was named for the port city of Toledo at its eastern end. The conflict was eventually resolved in favor of Ohio, with Michigan being compensated with what is now the western Upper Peninsula.

The Williams County Courthouse downtown was completed in 1891.  It is the third courthouse to occupy the property.

The Lake Shore and Michigan Southern Railway, later absorbed into the New York Central Railroad as part of its Chicago mainline, began serving Bryan in 1869. Due to the New York Central's line between Stryker, Ohio and Butler, Indiana, being both straight and flat, on July 23, 1966, Bryan was a mid-point of a record-setting speed run by a New York Central RDC-3, M-497 Black Beetle, modified with a pair of jet engines. From 1905 to 1939, Bryan was also the western terminus for the Toledo and Indiana Railway, an interurban that began operation between Toledo and Stryker in 1901.

Geography
Bryan is located at  (41.472692, -84.551928).

Demographics

2010 census
As of the census of 2010, there were 8,545 people, 3,761 households, and 2,214 families residing in the city. The racial makeup of the city was 94.3% White, 0.6% African American, 0.2% Native American, 0.9% Asian, 0.1% Pacific Islander, 2.1% from other races, and 2.0% from two or more races. Hispanic or Latino of any race were 5.1% of the population.

There were 3,761 households, of which 29.4% had children under the age of 18 living with them, 40.8% were married couples living together, 12.7% had a female householder with no husband present, 5.4% had a male householder with no wife present, and 41.1% were non-families. 34.9% of all households were made up of individuals, and 14.1% had someone living alone who was 65 years of age or older. The average household size was 2.24 and the average family size was 2.86.

The median age in the city was 39.7 years. 23.6% of residents were under the age of 18; 8.1% were between the ages of 18 and 24; 24.8% were from 25 to 44; 26.7% were from 45 to 64; and 16.8% were 65 years of age or older. The gender makeup of the city was 47.5% male and 52.5% female.

2000 census
As of the census of 2000, there were 8,333 people, 3,528 households, and 2,155 families residing in the city. The population density was 1,821.7 people per square mile (704.0/km2). There were 3,733 housing units at an average density of 816.1 per square mile (315.4/km2). The racial makeup of the city was 96.23% White, 0.31% African American, 0.23% Native American, 0.71% Asian, 1.40% from other races, and 1.12% from two or more races. Hispanic or Latino of any race were 3.73% of the population.

There were 3,528 households, out of which 29.7% had children under the age of 18 living with them, 45.7% were married couples living together, 11.4% had a female householder with no husband present, and 38.9% were non-families. 32.9% of all households were made up of individuals, and 13.7% had someone living alone who was 65 years of age or older. The average household size was 2.31 and the average family size was 2.94.

In the city, the population was spread out, with 24.8% under the age of 18, 8.4% from 18 to 24, 28.7% from 25 to 44, 22.0% from 45 to 64, and 16.1% who were 65 years of age or older. The median age was 37 years. For every 100 females, there were 90.6 males. For every 100 females age 18 and over, there were 84.2 males.

The median income for a household in the city was $36,978, and the median income for a family was $45,965. Males had a median income of $34,641 versus $22,434 for females. The per capita income for the city was $20,069. About 3.9% of families and 6.0% of the population were below the poverty line, including 5.1% of those under age 18 and 5.9% of those age 65 or over.

Economy
Bryan's manufacturers produce a diversity of items.  However, it is best known for products made by two companies headquartered in the city. Dum Dum lollipops, Saf-T-Pops and Marshmallow Circus Peanuts are made by Spangler Candy Company (the largest producer of candy canes in the world), and the Etch A Sketch (now manufactured in China) was developed by the Ohio Art Company. Allied Moulded Products, premier manufacturer of electrical enclosures, has been located in Bryan for 60 years. The city is also home to Titan Tire Corporation, makers of Goodyear- and Titan-brand off-road tires. In 2005 Sun Pharmaceutical purchased a plant specializing in generic medications from former operator Valeant Pharmaceuticals. The plant was sold to Kansas City, Missouri-based Nostrum Laboratories in December 2015.

Media
WQCT-AM, which plays oldies, WBNO-FM, which plays classic hits, and WLZZ-FM in nearby Montpelier, which plays country music, are the local commercial radio stations. Another radio station licensed to Bryan is WGBE-FM, a simulcast of classical music/National Public Radio station WGTE-FM in Toledo.

Transportation
Bryan is served by Amtrak's Lake Shore Limited service at an unmanned station along the former New York Central line. Norfolk Southern Railway operates the line for high-volume freight service passing through Bryan between the east and Chicago.

The city is served by U.S. Route 6 (US 6), US 127, State Route 2 (SR 2), SR 15, and SR 34. SR 15 connects to the Ohio Turnpike, which passes to the north of Bryan. Williams County Airport is the nearest general aviation airport.

Education
Bryan City School District operates Fountain City Christian School, a private nondenominational Christian K-12 school, St. Patrick's Catholic School, a combined church and K-8 school, Bryan Public Elementary School and Bryan Middle/High School.

Bryan has a public library, a branch of the Williams County Public Library.

Notable people

 Richard Cramer, actor
 Steve Fireovid, professional baseball pitcher
 Ned Garver, professional baseball pitcher
 Dr. Margaret Goodell, stem cell scientist and professor at Baylor College of Medicine
 Bob Hartman, guitarist and founder of the pioneer Christian rock band Petra
 William Isaac, chairman of the Federal Deposit Insurance Corporation from 1981 to 1985 and frequent commentator on financial regulatory matters
 J.O. Kinnaman, biblical scholar and archaeologist
 Horace Prettyman, the first Ohioan to play football for the University of Michigan
 Richard Schreder, sailplane designer and pilot
 Matt Wisler, professional baseball pitcher

References

External links
City website

 
Cities in Williams County, Ohio
County seats in Ohio
Populated places established in 1840
1840 establishments in Ohio
Cities in Ohio